HM Prison Parkhurst is a Category B men's prison situated in Parkhurst on the Isle of Wight, operated by His Majesty's Prison Service. Parkhurst prison is one of the two formerly separate prisons that today make up HMP Isle of Wight, the other being Albany.

History
Parkhurst as an institution began in 1778 as a military hospital and children's asylum. By 1838, it was a prison for children. 123 Parkhurst apprentices were sent to the Colony of New Zealand in 1842 and 1843, and a total of almost 1500 boys between the ages of 12 and 18 years were sent to various colonies in Australia and New Zealand. Swan River Colony (Western Australia) received 234 between 1842 and 1849, then  chose to accept adult convicts as well. Victoria and Tasmania also received "Parkhurst Boys", who were always referred to officially as "apprentices", not as "convicts". Parkhurst Prison Governor Captain George Hall (in office: 1843-1861) employed boys to make bricks to build the C and M block wings onto the building.

Parkhurst was considered one of the toughest jails in the British Isles. Almost from its beginnings as a prison for young offenders, Parkhurst was subject to fierce criticism by the public, politicians and in the press for its harsh régime (including the use of leg irons initially). It became a particular focus of critique for reformers - most notably Mary Carpenter (1807-1877) - campaigning against the use of imprisonment for children. In 1966 Parkhurst became one of the few top-security prisons (called  "Dispersals" because they dispersed the more troublesome prisoners rather than concentrating them all in one place) in the United Kingdom, but it lost "Dispersal" status in 1995. In 2009, Parkhurst joined HM Prison Albany to form super-prison HM Prison Isle of Wight, with each site retaining its old name.

1995 escape

On 3 January 1995, three prisoners (two murderers and a blackmailer) made their way out of the prison and enjoyed four days of freedom before being recaptured. One of them, Keith Rose, was an amateur pilot. During those four days, the escapees lived rough in a shed in a garden in Ryde, having failed to steal a plane from the local flying club. A programme entitled Britain's Island Fortress was made about this prison escape for National Geographic Channel's Breakout documentary series.

Notable inmates
High-profile criminals including Lord William Beauchamp Nevill, the Yorkshire Ripper Peter Sutcliffe, Moors Murderer Ian Brady, drug smuggler Terrance John Clark and the Kray twins, were incarcerated there.

Michael Gaughan died at Parkhurst after a 64-day hunger strike. In December 1971, Gaughan had been sentenced at the Old Bailey to seven years imprisonment for his part in an IRA bank robbery in Hornsey, north London, which yielded just £530, and for the possession of two revolvers. On 31 March 1974, Gaughan went on hunger strike demanding political status. British policy at this time was to force feed hunger strikers. Gaughan was force-fed 17 times during course of his hunger strike. The last time he was force-fed was the night before his death on Sunday, 2 June. He died on Monday 3 June 1974, aged 24. Graham Young, also known as the "Teacup Poisoner", died at Parkhurst of a heart attack in 1990.

War criminal Radovan Karadžić has been serving a life sentence at Parkhurst since May 2021.

References

External links
Ministry of Justice pages on Parkhurst 

Parkhurst
Parkhurst
1805 establishments in England
Newport, Isle of Wight
Dispersal prisons